The 2012 Finnish Cup is the 58th season of the main annual association football cup competition in Finland. It is organised as a single-elimination knock–out tournament. Participation in the competition is voluntary. A total of 198 teams registered for the competition, with 12 teams from the Veikkausliiga, 10 from the Ykkönen, 28 from the Kakkonen, 54 from the Kolmonen and 94 teams from other divisions. 

The tournament started on 6 January 2012 with the first match of Round 1.  Many matches in the early rounds are played on artificial pitches in indoor halls.

Teams

Round 1 
In this round 34 clubs entered from the Finnish fourth level and below, while the other 109 clubs from the lower divisions received byes to the next round. These matches took place between 6 and 21 January 2012.

Round 2 
In this round 126 clubs participated from the Finnish fourth level and below. These matches commenced on 14 January 2012.

Round 3 
In this round 68 clubs entered from the Finnish fourth level and below. These matches commenced on 5 February 2012.

Round 4 
In this round 72 clubs participated, including 10 teams from the Ykkönen and 28 teams from the Kakkonen . These matches commenced on 14 February 2012.

Round 5
In this round 40 clubs will participate, including 4 teams from the Veikkausliiga (Teams which have been eliminated from the League Cup). These matches are due to commence on 15 March 2012.

Round 6
In this round 24 clubs will participate, including 4 teams from the Veikkausliiga. These matches are due to commence on 29 March 2012.

Round 7
In this round 16 clubs will participate, including 4 teams from the Veikkausliiga. These matches are due to commence on 24 April 2012.

Quarter-finals
In this round 8 clubs will participate. These 4 matches are due to be played on 9 and 10 May 2012.

Semi-finals
In this round 4 clubs will participate.

Final
The Suomen Cup final is due to be played on 29 September 2012.

References

External links
 Suomen Cup Official site 
 FutisForum2 

2012
Finnish Cup
Cup